Assyrian Mexicans are Mexicans of Assyrian descent or Assyrian citizens who have Mexican citizenship. Most of the Assyrian immigrants who arrived in the country were Chaldean Catholic, as they fled from religious persecution and ethnic persecution in their historical Assyrian homeland in modern-day Iraq, Turkey, Syria and Iran.

History 
The immigration of Assyrian-Chaldeans from northern Iraq to North America started at the beginning of the 20th century. Chaldo-Assyrians, and Armenians all came to the New World looking for job opportunities and for a better life. Driven out by the harsh treatment of the conquering Turks, most followed family members, joining them in established businesses. Jajjo Hajji is widely considered the first pioneer in Mexico. Hajji ended up in Veracruz, Mexico after leaving Adana, Turkey in 1901. Several other Chaldo-Assyrians migrated from Tel-Keppe to Mexico and established communities in Salina Cruz, Saint Louis, Tecuala, Estabeca, Montreux, Mérida Yucatán, and Mexico City.

In 1910, Marougi Qatoo and his brother Putrus Qatoo took a 30-day boat trip to the capital. This was one of the first North American cities in the 20th century that Chaldean Catholic Assyrians migrated to, later moving from Mexico City to the U.S. state of Michigan. In 1927, immigration from Iraq to Mexico was significantly halted due to visa restrictions and travel trends were relocated to the United States and Canada. The last two Assyrian immigrants to leave Iraq for Mexico were Darraj Yousif Rabban and Jirjes Shango. By 1929 there were 55 documented Chaldo-Assyrians living in Mexico. Today, the Qatoo family's second and third generations are well established with business and education in Mexico City. There are many Assyrian professionals and politicians in Mexico. José Murat Casab (born October 18, 1947) is a Mexican politician and a member of the Institutional Revolutionary Party. He ran as the Governor of Oaxaca from 1998 until 2004.

Culture 

Due to a diluted population and a community scattered over a large geographic region, there is not a strong number of Chaldean churches in Mexico. Youth groups, social organizations, and inter-ethnic marriage in the Assyrian-Mexican community have resulted in a marked language shift away from Neo-Aramaic toward Spanish. The majority especially those of younger generations speak Spanish as their first language.

See also 
 Assyrian–Chaldean–Syriac diaspora

References 

Immigration to Mexico
Assyrian Chaldean Syriac
Mexico